Wollyu-bong(Hangul:월류봉) is located in Wonchon-ri, Hwanggan-myeon, Yeongdong County, Chungbuk, South Korea.

The height of the peak is 407m and one of the 8 Scenic Sites of Hancheon(한천팔경)

It was named Wollyu, meaning a 'peak where the moon stops,' as a way to describe the beautiful view of the moonlight shining upon the cliff.

The 8 picturesque places on Wollyu Peak, which seems to have been sculpted and erected in Wonchon-ri, Hwanggan-myeon, are referred to as the 8 scenic sites of Hancheon.

References

Yeongdong County
Tourism in South Korea